This page provides supplementary chemical data on tetrachloroethylene.

Material Safety Data Sheet  

The handling of this chemical may incur notable safety precautions. It is highly recommended that you seek the Material Safety Datasheet (MSDS) for this chemical from a reliable source  such as SIRI, and follow its directions. MSDS is available from Fisher Scientific.

Structure and properties

Thermodynamic properties

Vapor pressure of liquid

Table data obtained from CRC Handbook of Chemistry and Physics 47th ed. Note that "(s)" annotation indicates equilibrium temperature of vapor pressure of solid. Otherwise indication is equilibrium temperature of vapor of liquid.

Distillation data
See also
 Trichloroethylene (data page)

Spectral data

References

 

Chemical data pages
Chemical data pages cleanup